The 1965 edition of the Campeonato Carioca kicked off on September 11, 1965 and ended on December 19, 1965. It was organized by FCF (Federação Carioca de Futebol, or Carioca Football Federation). Eight teams participated. Flamengo won the title for the 15th time. no teams were relegated.

System
The tournament would be disputed in a double round-robin format, with the team with the most points winning the title and the team with the fewest points being relegated. However, before the 1966 championship started, the championship was expanded back to 12 teams, and as such the relegations were cancelled.

Championship

Second Level

Taça Guanabara

First round

Second round

Final standings

References

Campeonato Carioca seasons
Carioca